Grylloidea is the superfamily of insects, in the order Orthoptera, known as crickets. It includes the "true crickets", scaly crickets, wood crickets and other families, some only known from fossils.

Grylloidea dates from the Triassic period and contains about 3,700 known living species in some 528 genera, as well as 43 extinct species and 27 extinct genera.

Characteristics
The features which distinguish crickets in the superfamily Grylloidea from other Ensiferans are long, thread-like antennae, three tarsal segments, slender tactile cerci at the tip of the abdomen and bulbous sensory bristles on the cerci. They are the only insects to share this combination of characteristics.

The term cricket is popularly used for any cricket-like insect in the order Ensifera, being applied to the ant crickets, bush crickets (Tettigoniidae), Jerusalem crickets (Stenopelmatus), mole crickets, camel crickets and cave crickets (Rhaphidophoridae) and wētā (Anostostomatidae), and the relatives of these. All these insects have four tarsal segments and are probably more closely related to each other than they are to the true crickets, Gryllidae.

The body is cylindrical in most Grylloideans, but in some it is oval. The antennae are long and threadlike, except in the family Gryllotalpidae in which they are much shorter and brush-like. The pronotum is unkeeled and the sternal plates are flat, unadorned with flaps or spines. The tarsus has three segments and the tibia of the front leg bears the sound-detecting tympanal organs. The forewing of males bears the stridulatory organ, with a sound being created when a file on one wing is rubbed by a scraper on the other. There are two cerci at the tip of the abdomen and there is no stylus on the subgenital plate.

Classification
The following families are included in this superfamily.

Baissogryllidae Gorochov, 1985 †
Gryllidae Laicharting, 1781 – true crickets
Mogoplistidae Brunner von Wattenwyl, 1873 – scaly crickets
Phalangopsidae Blanchard, 1845 – 'spider crickets' and relatives - mostly southern hemisphere
†Protogryllidae Zeuner, 1937 (West-central Asia)
Trigonidiidae Saussure, 1874 (World-wide)
 subfamily Nemobiinae Saussure, 1877 (includes wood crickets)
 subfamily Trigonidiinae Saussure, 1874 ('sword-tail crickets', trigs)
 unplaced subfamily Pteroplistinae Chopard, 1936 (tropical Asia)

Excluded families
The following have now be placed as the separate superfamily Gryllotalpoidea.
Gryllotalpidae Leach, 1815 – mole crickets
Myrmecophilidae Saussure, 1874 - ant crickets.

References

External links

Insect superfamilies
Ensifera
Carnian first appearances
Extant Late Triassic first appearances